Saint-Philbert-sur-Orne (literally Saint-Philbert on Orne) is a commune in the Orne department in north-western France.

See also
 Communes of the Orne department

References

Saintphilbertsurorne